Mighty Man & Yukk is an animated series created by Ruby-Spears Productions. It was aired as part of the 1980-1981 show  The Plastic Man Comedy/Adventure Show.

Synopsis
Millionaire Brandon Brewster (voiced by Peter Cullen) uses a machine to reduce himself to only a few inches in height and give himself superpowers, including super-strength and flight; in this form, he's the costumed crime fighter Mighty Man. His partner is Yukk (voiced by Frank Welker), the "world's ugliest dog"; this anthropomorphic dog conceals his face by wearing a miniature doghouse on his head. The sight of his face destroys anything Yukk looks at. Mighty Man and Yukk are called in by the unnamed Mayor (voiced by John Stephenson) of the unnamed city to fight different supervillains.

The series has strong resemblance to other Ruby-Spears creations at Hanna-Barbera Productions, such as Dynomutt, Dog Wonder.

Cast

Main
 Peter Cullen as Brandon Brewster/Mighty Man
 John Stephenson as Mayor, Anthead, Big Mouse, Magnet Man, Catman, Dr. Rufus T. Gadgets, Marble Man, Mr. Van Pire, Dr. Lash, Clyde
 Frank Welker as Yukk

Additional voices
 Michael Bell as Krime Klown, Nefario
 Henry Corden as Goldteeth, Kragg the Conqueror
 Casey Kasem as Beach Bum
 Allan Melvin as Coach Crime/Dee Gooder, Sanfon Vulch, Camera Man
 Alan Oppenheimer as Time Keeper
 Fred Travalena as Baby Man
 William Woodson as Miro the Mentalist

Episodes

References

External links
 Behind the Voice Actors: Mighty Man and Yukk
 Mighty Man and Yukk at The Big Cartoon Database
 TV.com: Mighty Man and Yukk

1970s American animated television series
1979 American television series debuts
1980s American animated television series
1980 American television series endings
American children's animated superhero television series
Animated duos
Animated television series about dogs
Fictional duos
Television series by Ruby-Spears